Xiangyang Subdistrict is a subdistrict in Zhalantun, Inner Mongolia, China. , it has four residential communities and one village under its administration.

See also 
 List of township-level divisions of Inner Mongolia

References 

Township-level divisions of Inner Mongolia
Zhalantun